The Women's 4 × 5 kilometre relay competition at the FIS Nordic World Ski Championships 2023 was held on 2 March 2023.

Results
The race was started at 12:29.

References

Women's 4 × 5 kilometre relay